José Lodi Batalha (born 28 April 1896, date of death unknown), known as just Batalha, was a Brazilian footballer. He played in two matches for the Brazil national football team in 1925. He was also part of Brazil's squad for the 1925 South American Championship.

References

External links
 

1896 births
Year of death missing
Brazilian footballers
Brazil international footballers
Footballers from Rio de Janeiro (city)
Association football goalkeepers
Vitória Futebol Clube (ES) players
CR Flamengo footballers
Fluminense FC players